Robert of Nantes (died 8 June 1254) was the Latin patriarch of Jerusalem from 1240 to 1254.

Early life and career

Robert was a native of the Saintonge. He was a bishop in Apulia, but was expelled by Holy Roman Emperor Frederick II. In 1236, Pope Gregory IX appointed him bishop of Nantes. In Nantes, Robert came into conflict with Peter I, Duke of Brittany and Peter's son John, whom the church accused of appropriating ecclesiastical property. Robert complained several times to Gregory and appealed to the pope in person in Rome in 1238.

Meanwhile, Emperor Frederick claimed the regency of the Kingdom of Jerusalem for his underage son Conrad II, whose mother, Queen Isabella II of Jerusalem, had died in childbirth. However, Frederick had been excommunicated by Gregory IX. In 1239, Gerold of Lausanne, Patriarch of Jerusalem, died during the Barons' Crusade. The canons of the Church of the Holy Sepulchre in Jerusalem selected the former Bishop of Acre, Jacques de Vitry, as his replacement, but as Jacques had recently died, Gregory IX appointed Robert instead in May 1240. Gregory likely appointed Robert because of his experience with Frederick in Apulia.

Gregory IX died in 1241 and was eventually succeeded by Pope Innocent IV in 1243. In the meantime, Robert remained in Europe and did not arrive in Jerusalem until 1244. Soon after his arrival, the Khwarazmian Turks captured Jerusalem. The Khwarazmians allied with Egypt and defeated a combined army from Jerusalem and Damascus at the Battle of La Forbie in October of the same year. Robert was present at the battle and barely escaped. In 1247, Robert sent a relic of the Holy Blood to Henry III of England in an ultimately unsuccessful attempt to convince him to go on crusade. The subsequent Seventh Crusade was instead led by King Louis IX of France, who invaded Egypt in 1250. Louis was defeated and taken captive at the Battle of al-Mansourah, and Robert was imprisoned along with him.

Death 
Robert died on 8 June 1254. He may have been over 80 years old; Jean of Joinville describes him as "an old and venerable man aged eighty years" at the time of his captivity with Louis in 1250. The canons of the Holy Sepulchre chose Opizzo Fieschi, Latin patriarch of Antioch, to succeed Robert. Opizio was the nephew of Innocent IV, but Innocent died before he could confirm this choice. Innocent's successor Pope Alexander IV appointed the bishop of Verdun and future pope Jacques Pantaléon as patriarch.

References

Sources
Charles Taillandier, Histoire ecclésiastique et civile de Bretagne, tome II (Paris, 1756).
Louis de Mas Latrie, "Les patriaches latins de Jérusalem", in Revue de l'Orient latin, vol. 1 (1893).
Bernard Hamilton, The Latin Church in the Crusader States: The Secular Church (London: Variorum, 1980).
Caroline Smith, ed., Joinville and Villehardouin: Chronicles of the Crusades (Penguin, 2008).

Year of birth missing
1254 deaths
Latin Patriarchs of Jerusalem
Christians of the Sixth Crusade
Christians of the Seventh Crusade
13th-century Roman Catholic archbishops in the Kingdom of Jerusalem
13th-century French Roman Catholic bishops
People from Charente-Maritime
Bishops of Nantes